Jungle Book is a 1942 independent Technicolor action-adventure film by the Korda brothers, loosely adapted from Rudyard Kipling's The Jungle Book (1894). The story centers on Mowgli, a feral young man who is kidnapped by villagers who are cruel to the jungle animals as they attempt to steal a dead king's cursed treasure. The film was directed by Zoltán Korda and produced by his brother Alexander, with the art direction done by their younger brother Vincent. The screenplay was written by Laurence Stallings. The film stars Sabu as Mowgli.

The cinematography was by Lee Garmes and W. Howard Greene and the music was by Miklós Rózsa. Because of World War II, the Korda brothers had moved their filmmaking to Hollywood in 1940, and Jungle Book is one of the films they produced during that Hollywood period. The film was a commercial success at the box office.

Plot
In an Indian village, Buldeo, an elderly storyteller, is paid by a visiting British memsahib to tell a story of his youth.

As a younger man, he recalls his village being attacked by Shere Khan the rogue tiger. The attack leads to the death of a man and the loss of the man's child. The child is adopted by grey wolves in the jungle and grows to be the wild youth Mowgli. Twelve years after, Mowgli is captured by the villagers and taken in by his mother Messua, despite Buldeo's prejudice on him for being from the jungle. He learns to speak and tries to imitate the ways of humans, and become friendly with Buldeo's daughter, Mahala. 

When Mowgli and Mahala explore the jungle, they discover a hidden chamber in a ruined palace, containing fabulous wealth. Warned by an aged cobra that the wealth brings death, they leave, but Mahala takes one coin as a memento. When Buldeo sees the coin, he  resolves to follow Mowgli to the site of the treasure.

Mowgli fights and uses a jambiya knife to kill Shere Khan, with some last minute help from Kaa, the Indian python. As he is skinning the body, Buldeo arrives. He threatens Mowgli with his hunting rifle to take him to the treasure, but is attacked by Mowgli's friend Bagheera, the black panther. Buldeo becomes convinced that Bagheera is Mowgli himself, shape-shifted into panther form. He tells the villagers that Mowgli is a witch, as is his mother. Mowgli is chained up and threatened with death, but escapes with his mother's help. However, she and another villager who tries to defend her are tied up and themselves threatened with burning for witchcraft.

Mowgli is followed by the greedy Buldeo and two friends, a pandit and a barber, to the lost city. They find the treasure and leave for the village with as much as they can carry. When they stop for the night, the priest tries to steal the treasure and murders the barber when the barber wakes up. The priest tells Buldeo that the barber had attacked him and that he had killed in self-defense, but Buldeo knows better. The next day, the priest attacks Buldeo while his back is turned, but Buldeo knocks him into the swamp where he is killed by a mugger crocodile. Mowgli tells Bagheera to chase Buldeo from the jungle, and Buldeo flees for his life, jettisoning the treasure.

His pride wounded, Buldeo tries to murder Mowgli and destroy the jungle by starting a forest fire. The wind turns and the fire threatens the village. The villagers flee, but Mowgli's mother and her defender are trapped. Mowgli brings the local elephants including their leader Hathi who help free the captives and rescue the jungle animals from the fire. He is invited to follow them to a new life downriver, but chooses to stay and protect the jungle.

The scene returns to the present day, with the elderly Buldeo admitting that the jungle defeated his youthful dreams and destroyed his reputation. When asked how he escaped from the fire and what became of Mowgli and his daughter, Buldeo says that is another story.

Cast

 Sabu as Mowgli
 Daniel and David Valdez as Baby Mowgli
 Joseph Calleia as Buldeo
 John Qualen as The barber
 Frank Puglia as The pundit
 Rosemary DeCamp as Messua
 Patricia O'Rourke as Mahala
 Ralph Byrd as Durgaived 
 Faith Brook as English girl
 Noble Johnson as Sikh
 Mel Blanc as Kaa, Gray Brother
 Martha Wentworth as White Hood

Production
In 1940, the three Korda brothers left London for Hollywood, where two of their films that had begun production in the UK were completed: The Thief of Bagdad and That Hamilton Woman.

United Artists lent Alexander Korda $300,000 to finance the production of Jungle Book, which was produced by the American company he set up for his Hollywood productions: Alexander Korda Films, Inc.

Laurence Stalling's adaptation was criticised for straying too far from the original, and the frequent disagreements between brothers Alexander and Zoltán did not help matters. Zoltán wanted an underplayed realistic story, while Alex favoured an exuberant fantasist epic. Alex, as always, got his way in the end.

Reception

Box office
The film was a notable success at the box office. In the United States and Canada, the film earned  in box office rentals. In total, the film grossed  from approximately 12.2 million ticket sales in the United States, equivalent to  adjusted for inflation in 2021. In the United Kingdom, its 1948 re-release earned £86,089.().

In France, it was one of the top ten highest-grossing films of 1946, drawing over 5 million admissions at the box office. At an average late-1940s admission price of 50francs, this was equivalent to an estimated francs. The film also sold  box office tickets in the Soviet Union when it released there in 1944.

Critical response
Bosley Crowther of The New York Times noted the filmmakers have "used a whole menagerie to get some remarkable effects, and a finer lot of sleek and lithe wild creatures has never been shown on a screen. But he hasn't put together a solid picture. It is mainly spectacle. Against the animal competition, the human actors show up quite badly." In summary, Crowther felt the "color is strikingly vivid and some of the individual scenes have natural charm. But the film, as a whole, is ostentatious." Variety similarly wrote: "Depending almost entirely on the pictorial grandeur and the production novelty, Korda has neglected any but a slight development of the human equation. Players therefore have unimportant assignments, with the exception of Sabu, who swims and swings his way through the jungle with ease and grace."

Harrison's Reports wrote: "This is a jungle fantasy, in which animals play an important part. It has been produced in gorgeous technicolor. The surroundings in which Sabu is cast are familiar ...But by being a fantasy, its appeal is not universal." Edwin Schallert of the Los Angeles Times praised the visuals and the animals, but cautioned: "To say that Jungle Book is as good in its narrative as The Thief is not easy. Many will feel that it is, and certainly it rates right alongside its predecessor." On Rotten Tomatoes, the film has an approval rating of 57% based on 14 reviews, with an average rating 6.9/10.

Awards
The film was nominated for four Academy Awards.

Nominated
 Best Art Direction-Interior Decoration, Color (Vincent Korda, Julia Heron)
 Best Visual Effects (Lawrence W. Butler, William H. Wilmarth)
 Best Original Score
 Best Cinematography

Soundtrack album
In 1943 the film's score, in a recording made directly from the soundtrack, was released on a 78-RPM record album with narration by Sabu, the film's star, added. It became the first commercial recording of a non-musical U.S. film's orchestral score to be released. The album was a success.

Although the film is in the public domain, the master 35mm elements are with ITV Studios Global Entertainment.  An official video release is currently available via The Criterion Collection.

See also
 List of films in the public domain in the United States

References

Bibliography

External links

 
 
 
 
 
 
 Criterion Collection Essay

1942 films
1940s fantasy adventure films
American fantasy adventure films
British fantasy adventure films
The Jungle Book films
Films about animals
Films about apes
Jungle adventure films
Films set in India
Films set in the 1890s
London Films films
United Artists films
Films directed by Zoltán Korda
Films produced by Alexander Korda
Films scored by Miklós Rózsa
Articles containing video clips
1940s English-language films
1940s American films
1940s British films